The Impossible is a 2012 English-language Spanish disaster drama directed by Juan Antonio Bayona and written by Sergio G. Sánchez. It is based on the experience of María Belón and her family in the 2004 Indian Ocean tsunami. The cast includes Naomi Watts, Ewan McGregor, and Tom Holland.

The film received positive reviews from critics for its direction and its acting, especially for Watts who was nominated for the Academy Award for Best Actress, the Golden Globe Award for Best Actress – Motion Picture Drama, and a Screen Actors Guild Award for Outstanding Performance by a Female Actor in a Leading Role.

Accolades

See also
 List of awards and nominations received by Naomi Watts
 List of awards and nominations received by Ewan McGregor

References

External links
 

Lists of accolades by film